This is a comparison of object–relational database management systems (ORDBMSs).  Each system has at least some features of an object–relational database; they vary widely in their completeness and the approaches taken.

The following tables compare general and technical information; please see the individual products' articles for further information. Unless otherwise specified in footnotes, comparisons are based on the stable versions without any add-ons, extensions or external programs.

Basic data

Object features 
Information about what fundamental ORDBMSes features are implemented natively.

Data types
Information about what data types are implemented natively.

See also 
 Comparison of database administration tools
 Comparison of object database management systems
 Comparison of relational database management systems
 List of relational database management systems

Notes

External links 
 Arvin.dk, comparison of different SQL implementations

object-relational databases